Aethalochroa insignis, common name Indian stick mantis, is a species of praying mantis found in India that was originally identified as a variety of A. ashmoliana.

See also
List of mantis genera and species

References

Insects of India
Aethalochroa
Insects described in 1878
Taxa named by James Wood-Mason